Dreamland: A Self-Help Manual for a Frightened Nation (in the original ) is a book by the Icelandic author Andri Snær Magnason.

It became the number one best-selling book in Iceland in 2006, and was winner of the Icelandic Literary Award, and the Icelandic Bookseller Prize the same year. The English edition of the book has a foreword by the Icelandic artist Björk.

Content

Dreamland is Andri Snaer Magnason's critique against the current decision taken by the Icelandic government to dam Iceland's rivers in order to produce energy that can be delivered to aluminium smelters. Magnason describes how Iceland's government actively have pursued the idea to attract foreign aluminium companies to Iceland with the promise of the "cheapest energy in the world". The government advertisement described Iceland's energy potential as 30 TWh/year. Magnason argues in the book that in order to accomplish this, the majority of Iceland's rivers would need to be exploited.

It is set up as a series of thoughts on issues in modern Iceland and the past Iceland and deals heavily with the Kárahnjúkar Hydropower Plant and other similar works being done. It was the best sold book in Iceland in 2006 and raised Icelanders' interest in environmentalism by a large amount. In the book the Icelandic nation is encouraged to look to more "futuristic" types of business than aluminium processing and to stop believing that they can't do anything for themselves.

Bibliographical details and translations
 Andri Snær Magnason, Draumalandið: Sjálfshjálparbók handa hræddri þjóð (Reykjavík: Mál og menning, 2006) [original]
 Dreamland: A Self-Help Manual for a Frightened Nation, trans. by Nicholas Jones (London: Citizen Press, 2008),  [English translation]
 Draumalandið: sjálfshjálparbók handa hræddri þjóð], trans. by Kaoru Moriuchi (Tokyo: s.n., 2009),  [Japanese translation]
 Drømmeland: selvhjælpsbog til en ængstelig nation, med forord af Björk, trans. by Kim Lembek (København: Tiderne skifter, 2009) 
 Traumland: was bleibt, wenn alles verkauft ist?, trans. from the English by Stefanie Fahrner (Freiburg: Orange Press, 2011),  [German translation]
 El país de los sueños: manual de autoayuda para una nación atemorizada, trans. by Editorial Aire (s.l.: Aire, 2013),  [Spanish translation]

See also
Dreamland (2009 film), based on the book
Kárahnjúkar Hydropower Plant

References

External links
http://www.draumalandid.is/

Icelandic non-fiction literature
Environmentalism in Iceland
2006 non-fiction books
2006 in the environment
Political books